In It to Win It is the eighth studio album by American R&B singer-songwriter Charlie Wilson. It was released on February 17, 2017, by RCA Records. The album includes collaborations with Snoop Dogg, Lalah Hathaway, Wiz Khalifa, T.I., Robin Thicke and Pitbull.

Commercial performance 
In It to Win It debuted at number seven on the Billboard 200 with 48,000 album-equivalent units, of which 47,000 were pure album sales.

Track listing

Notes
  signifies co-producer
  signifies a vocal producer

Charts

Weekly

Year-end

Release history

References

Charlie Wilson (singer) albums
2017 albums
RCA Records albums